Arévalo is a Spanish surname. Notable people with the surname include:

Arévalo (comedian) (born 1947), Spanish comedian and actor
Alfredo Arévalo (born 1976), Guatemalan marathon runner
Arístides Chavier Arévalo (1867 – 1942), Puerto Rican pianist, modernism composer, musicologist and music author
Bonifacio Flores Arévalo (1850 – 1920), sculptor and patron of the arts
Bueno Arévalo Julio Fernando (born ?), Ecuadorian musician
Cecilia Soledad Arévalo (born 1968), Mexican politician
Daniel Arévalo Gallegos (born 1962), Mexican politician
Daniel Sánchez Arévalo (born 1970), Spanish screenwriter and film director
Diana Arevalo (born 1981), American nonprofit executive and politician
Domingo Arévalo (born 1968), former Paraguayan footballer
Edelmiro Arévalo (born 1929), former Paraguayan football
Egidio Arévalo Ríos (born 1982), Uruguayan footballer
Éider Arévalo (born 1993), Colombian racewalker
Faustino Arévalo (1747 – 1824), Spanish Jesuit hymnographer and patrologist
Fernando Espino Arévalo (born 1949), Mexican politician
Gonzalo Moreno Arévalo (born 1958), Mexican politician
Guillermo Arévalo (born 1952), Shipibo shaman of the Peruvian Amazon
Javier Arevalo (born 1937), Mexican artist
José Antonio Arévalo González (born 1971), Mexican politician 
Juan Arévalo (? – ?), Assembly Member of the Declaration of Philippine Independence
Juan José Arévalo (1904 – 1990), Guatemalan president
Luis Antonio Arévalo Espadas (born 1982), Spanish swimmer
Marcelo Arévalo (born 1990), Salvadoran tennis player, younger brother of Rafael
Marco Vinicio Cerezo Arévalo (born 1942), Guatemalan politician
Rafael Arévalo (born 1986), Salvadoran tennis player, older brother of Marcelo
Rafael Arévalo Martínez (1884 – 1975), Guatemalan writer
Raúl Arévalo (born 1979), Spanish film actor
Robert Arevalo (born 1938 ), Filipimo actor
Samantha Arévalo (born 1994), Ecuadorian swimmer
Sara Carbonero Arévalo (born 1984), Spanish sports journalist
Tito Arévalo (1911 – 2000), Filipino actor and musician
Tomás Domínguez Arévalo (1882-1952), Spanish politician
Víctor Hugo Arévalo Jordán (born 1946), Bolivian writer and noted university professor
Young Man of Arévalo (15th/early 16th century – possibly second half of 16th century), Spanish crypto-Muslim author 

Spanish-language surnames